Last Hill is a small hill,  high, with a rock ridge at its crest and a cliff at its north side, standing  south-southwest of Hope Bay and  east of the northeast shore of Duse Bay on Tabarin Peninsula, Antarctica. It was probably seen by the Swedish Antarctic Expedition, 1901–04, under Otto Nordenskjöld, but was first charted in 1946 by the Falkland Islands Dependencies Survey, who so named it because it marks the last climb on the sledge route between Hope Bay and Duse Bay.

References

Hills of Trinity Peninsula